Shingo-La (also known as Shinku La) is a mountain pass in India, on the border between Ladakh and  Himachal Pradesh.

Geography 
There is a shallow lake or pool 20m below the pass. The pass is on a long-distance footpath linking Zanskar and Lahaul, used often by locals and trekkers alike. For trekkers it is one of the technically easiest 5000m passes in Indian Himalaya, involving no glacier trekking nor steep climbs. There is snow on the pass all year round, although in the summer only a small stretch of snow has to be passed. There is an official sign proclaiming height of the pass as 16,615.500 feet. The height indicated by various trekking website varies from 4900 to 5100 meters.

This pass may be considered as an entry point to Lugnak Valley in Zanskar. The nearest inhabited village on Zanskar side is Kargyakh and on the Lahaul side is Chikka. Both the villages generally involve two days trekking from the pass. The base camps for crossing the pass are set up at Ramjak or Chumik Nakpo from Darcha side and Lakong from Padum side.

A rudimentary road to Shingo La was first constructed in 2016. The road was extended to Lakhang above the Kargyakh-Chu in 2017 and a very rough extension to the village of Kargyakh was made by bulldozers and towed dump trucks in 2018. As of the summers of 2018 and 2019, the road from Lakong to Kargyakh was routed within the waters of the Kargyakh-Chu River and was impassible to all but tracked or large wheeled offroad construction vehicles.

The winter of 2018/2019 did severe damage to both sides of the Shingo La road and in June 2019 it was described as being rebuilt.
However, by September 2020, the stretch was repaired, and many bikers have successfully travelled.
By September 2021, the 35 km stretch starting from Darcha leading up to base of Shinkula pass was black-toped.

Shinku La Tunnel

National Highways & Infrastructure Development Corporation Limited (NHIDCL) under Ministry of Road, Transport & Highways has expedited the detailed project report (DPR) work on the Shinkun La Tunnel. However, a new shorter  4.25 km long alignment has been approved and  tunnel is expected to be completed by 2025. Border Roads Organisation (BRO) is making a double-lane road between Himachal Pradesh and Ladakh under Shingo La to enable all weather road connectivity between Manali and Leh via Darcha, Shingo La tunnel, Padum and Nimu with Nimmu–Padum–Darcha road. The double lane road is likely to be completed by late 2023. With the construction of the tunnel, inhabitants of about 15 villages of Zanskar Valley in Ladakh will also be relieved since the valley remains cut off due to heavy snowfall during the winter.This tunnel is aimed to boost commerce in the Zanskar Valley by bringing better connectivity.

With the existing Atal Tunnel and after the completion of under-construction Shinku La Tunnel, Nimmu–Padum–Darcha Road  will become all weather road.

Current status 

May 2021: There were two options for constructing the tunnel, longer tunnel of 13.5 km was rejected and a shorter 4.25 km tunnel was approved, which would be completed by 2024 but looking at the present condition it may take a few years more to complete it. As of October 2022, no work from both side has yet been started, as per local people. It is understood that the total cost of the BRO tunnel construction will be around ₹1,000 crore due to the simple design and requirement of basic electromechanical fittings. The 4.25km tunnel will have longitudinal ventilation using banana fans, which require minimum electricity and less operational costs.

April 2022: The Border Roads Organisation (BRO) will start the construction of the Shinku La tunnel by July this year. The Government of India has already started 'Project Yojak' of BRO to execute this ambitious project. This  tunnel is expected to be completed by 2025. The south portal of the tunnel will be at the base of Shinku La and the north portal near Lakhang. “There will be two tubes for to and fro traffic in the tunnel,” BRO DG Choudhary said in April 2022.

June 2022: The land acquisition process with an aim to start the work in July has been speeded up.
BRO is also consulting with the officials of the forest department, revenue, and public works department. The land acquisition process is expected to complete in July.

See also 

 India-China Border Roads
 Leh Manali road
 Nimmu–Padam–Darcha road

References

Mountain passes of Ladakh
Mountain passes of Himachal Pradesh
Geography of Lahaul and Spiti district